Hlavatce is the name of several locations in the Czech Republic:

 Hlavatce (České Budějovice District), a village in the South Bohemian Region
 Hlavatce (Tábor District), a village in the South Bohemian Region